King Xian of Zhou, personal name Ji Bian, was the thirty-fifth king of the Chinese Zhou dynasty and the twenty-third of the Eastern Zhou.

Very little is known about him. He succeeded his brother King Lie of Zhou in 368 BC and ruled until his death in 321 BC.

He sent gifts to many of the feudal states, supposedly his vassals, particularly Qin and Chu. Late in his reign, the leaders of the states declared themselves kings, and ceased to recognise the king of Zhou as even nominally their overlord.

After his death, his son King Shenjing of Zhou ruled over China.

Family
Sons:
 Prince Ding (d. 315 BC), ruled as King Shenjing of Zhou from 320–315 BC

Ancestry

See also
Family tree of ancient Chinese emperors

Notes 

321 BC deaths
Zhou dynasty kings
4th-century BC Chinese monarchs
Year of birth unknown